Glen Fogel (born 1977 in Denver, Colorado) is a New York-based artist.

Work 
Glen Fogel's work constructs narratives from a combination of personal experience and politically charged issues using video, installation, sculpture, and photography. His works are often centered around objects laden with complex emotional and symbolic associations. About the intensely personal nature of his work, Fogel has said: “I wonder if all art is portraiture of some kind, like the primal impulse to portray ourselves.”

Fogel’s 5-channel video installation "With Me... You" (2011) uses his strategy of superimposing elements of his personal history onto found public material and forms of mass marketing. For this piece, Fogel borrowed and videotaped wedding and engagement rings in his family’s possession. Going back to his great-grandmother's ring that has been stripped of its jewels, and including the wedding rings of his mother and sister, Fogel assembled 4 generations of his family’s most precious heirlooms into a synced video installation. Filmed in extreme closeup and high definition, Fogel exploits the meticulous display style of The Home Shopping Network. The rings rotate, freely floating in unarticulated space while a sequence of colored gels form the background, flooding the gallery with ambient hues. The video is interrupted intermittently when an incoming ‘text message’ sound signals fluorescent lights to switch on in the gallery, replacing and at times obliterating the images.

Education and career
In 2010, Fogel received his Master of Fine Arts from The Milton Avery Graduate School of the Arts at Bard College (Annandale-On-Hudson, NY).

Glen Fogel is represented by JTT gallery in New York, NY. He has had solo exhibitions in New York, Chicago, Portland, Houston, Savannah, Santa Barbara, Istanbul, Turkey and Porto, Portugal. His work has been part of many group shows, including the 2002 Whitney Biennial and more recently, "Uncommon Commonalities" (Aspect/Ratio, 2015).

Fogel is currently the Technical Director and a faculty member at The Milton Avery Graduate School of the Arts at Bard College (Annandale-On-Hudson, NY). He is also a visiting artist lecturer at The Cooper Union, New York, NY, and Princeton University, NJ.

Awards and honors
In 2009 he was awarded the Princess Grace Award, and in 2008 he was the recipient of a grant from The Rema Hort Mann Foundation. In 2006, he was the recipient of a grant from MAP Production Fund, Creative Capital.

References

External links
 Personal website

1977 births
Living people
American artists
New media artists
Bard College alumni